Rajeswar Vats (born 11 October 1953) is an Indian former cricketer. He played first-class cricket for Delhi and Railways between 1973 and 1985.

See also
 List of Delhi cricketers

References

External links
 

1953 births
Living people
Indian cricketers
Delhi cricketers
Railways cricketers
Cricketers from Delhi